Nathan Johnson may refer to:

Nate Johnson (meteorologist), American meteorologist
Nathan Johnson (abolitionist) (1797–1880), African-American abolitionist
Nathan Johnson (canoeist) (born 1976), American Olympic canoer
Nathan Johnson, conspirator in the 2008 Barack Obama assassination plot in Denver
Nathan Johnson (musician) (born 1976), film composer, songwriter and music producer
Nathan M. Johnson (born 1968), Democratic member of the Texas Senate, lawyer, and Dragon Ball Z dub composer

See also
Nathan and Mary (Polly) Johnson properties, named for the abolitionist
Nathaniel Johnson (disambiguation)
Nate Johnson (disambiguation)